Renovation Raiders is a home renovation show on the American television channel HGTV. Its host is Amy Matthews. The premise of the show was to do a major renovation on a family's home in five hours and surprise one of the homeowners.

According to the script, Matthews would work with a family friend to plan the renovation. It would include anything from redoing a family room to a full kitchen remodel. Once the plan was in place and all the materials were ready, she would work with the family friend to plan a night out for the homeowners; usually a show and movie while the crew worked on the house.

The show was created by Scott Seven and Kevin Budzynski, both natives of Grand Rapids, Michigan.

References

HGTV original programming
2013 American television series debuts
2015 American television series endings
Home renovation television series